George Grimes (July 3, 1922 – April 28, 1971) was an American football wide receiver who played for the Detroit Lions during the 1948 season.

Biography

Early life and education
Grimes was born on July 3, 1922. He attended Tazewell High School in Virginia, where he played on the basketball and football teams. After high school, he played football for the University of Virginia. Before he completed his studies, however, he joined the US Marines as a second lieutenant fighting in World War II. After combat, he returned to the University of Virginia and continued playing football.

Career and later life
After college, Grimes was drafted by the Los Angeles Rams and the Buffalo Bills, but instead played for the Detroit Lions. He played in nine games for the Lions during the 1948 season, after which he retired from professional football. Grimes died on April 28, 1971.

References

1922 births
1971 deaths
American football wide receivers
Detroit Lions players
United States Marine Corps personnel of World War II
United States Marine Corps officers